Valea Racilor may refer to the following places in Romania:

 Valea Racilor, a village in the commune Negomir, Gorj County
 Valea Racilor (Arieș), a tributary of the Arieș in the Apuseni Mountains, Cluj County
 Valea Racilor (Jilț), a tributary of the Jilț in Gorj County